General elections were held in Malta on 15 December 1913. All eight elected seats were uncontested as the members elected in 1912 were all returned unopposed.

Background
The elections were held under the Chamberlain Constitution, with members elected from eight single-member constituencies.

Results
A total of 8,252 people were registered to vote, but no votes were cast.

References

1913
Malta
1913 in Malta
Single-candidate elections
Uncontested elections
December 1913 events
Malta